Trincomalee railway station is a railway station in the city of Trincomalee in eastern Sri Lanka. Owned by Sri Lanka Railways, the state-owned railway operator, the station is the eastern terminus of the Trincomalee Line which links Trincomalee District with the capital Colombo.

Services
Intercity trains operating from Trincomalee station connect Trincomalee with Colombo Fort and other cities along parts of the Trincomalee, Batticaloa, Northern, and Main Lines.  Rail bus also operates at Trincomalee, providing services within the Eastern Province.

See also
 List of railway stations in Sri Lanka
 List of railway stations by line order in Sri Lanka

Railway station
Railway stations on the Trincomalee Line